Georg Ludolf Dissen (17 December 1784 – 21 September 1837) was a German classical philologist who was a native of Groß Schneen, a village in the  District of Göttingen.

He studied classical philology at the University of Göttingen, where one of his instructors was Christian Gottlob Heyne (1729-1812). After graduation, he was a lecturer at Göttingen, and in 1812 relocated to the University of Marburg as an associate professor. The following year he returned to Göttingen, where he was a colleague to Friedrich Gottlieb Welcker (1784-1868), Ernst Karl Friedrich Wunderlich (1783-1816) and Karl Otfried Müller (1797-1840). In 1817 he was appointed "full professor", and in 1833 became a full member of the Göttingen Academy of Sciences.

Dissen was considered an excellent teacher, and was an important influence to the development of philologist Karl Lachmann (1793-1851). Among his written works were editions of Pindar (1830), Tibullus (1835) and the orations of Demosthenes (1837). In addition, he collaborated with Philipp August Böckh (1785-1867) on the latter's masterful edition of Pindar.

References 
 "This article incorporates text from a translation of an equivalent article at the German Wikipedia".

1784 births
1837 deaths
People from Göttingen (district)
German classical philologists
Academic staff of the University of Göttingen